An action camera or action cam is a digital camera designed for recording action while being immersed in it. Action cameras are therefore typically compact, rugged, and waterproof at the surface level. They typically use CMOS image sensors, and can take photos in burst mode and time-lapse mode as well as record high-definition video (as of 2019, mid-range to high-end action cameras can record 4K video at 60 fps). Slow-motion video recording at 120 or 240 fps is also a common feature.

Overview
The camera is typically worn or mounted in such a way that it can shoot from the point of view of the shooter. Some examples of common places to mount an action camera are on a hat or helmet, on the chest, or on the handlebars of a bike or similar vehicle. They may also be mounted on a tripod or on a monopod for handheld use. An action camera is usually designed to require minimal interaction once recording has begun, as this allows continuous capture of the action without having to interact with the camera. A typical action camera records onto a micro SD card, and has either a Micro-USB or a USB-C connector.

Action cameras are associated with outdoor sports, and, often attached to helmets, surfboards or handlebars, are an integral part of many extreme sports such as base jumping and wingsuit flying. Sometimes several cameras are used to capture specific perspectives, such as a helmet camera that sees the perspective of the actor in combination with a second camera attached to the environment of the rider, such as a board, wing, handlebar or wrist, that looks back onto the rider and records their reactions.

The category is commonly associated with the GoPro range of cameras, and many action cameras come with a GoPro mount adapter to take advantage of the accessories available for these cameras. However, there are many GoPro alternatives which are entering the market of action cameras in recent times.

In 2014, worldwide action camera sales increased by 44 percent from the previous year and half of them have the capability to shoot Ultra High Definition at 4K resolution. Action camera sales have surpassed traditional camcorder and compact camera sales, and it is predicted that in 2019, action camera sales will surpass all types of cameras due to the sales of other camera types declining or stabilizing.

By 2021, the Ultra HD category of the action camera market is expected to reach $3.3 billion. The Full HD category, meanwhile, is expected to reach $2.2 billion, with the surveillance/security industry driving growth.

In 2018 Sony launched a shock and waterproof camera with a 1" sensor in a body size similar to an action camera.  However, Sony is not marketing it as an action camera; rather, as a video professional camera with the capability to shoot with up to 15 cameras at the same time.

Product lines
Besides the GoPro line, other models of action cams include the:
 Sony HDR-AS10, HDR-AS15 and HDR-AS30V
 Garmin VIRB
 Panasonic HX-A500E
 Toshiba Camileo X-Sports
 Polaroid Cube
 TomTom Bandit
 Xiaomi YiCamera
 Ricoh WG-M1
 Insta360
 DJI Osmo Action

See also 

Body worn video
Dashcam
Rugged compact digital camera
Underwater photography
Webcam
360 cameras
Refcam

References